Batuhan Akçaoğlu (born 14 August 2002) is a Turkish male compound archer and part of the national team.

Sport career
In 2022, Batuhan Akçaoğlu won the gold medal in the men's team compound event at the European Archery Championships held in Munich, Germany. He won two bronze medals in the men's U-21 team compound and U-21 Individual event at the Laško, Slovenia event in the 2022 European Indoor Archery Championships.

References

External links
 

2002 births
Living people
Turkish male archers
21st-century Turkish people